Richland Township is an inactive township in Scott County, in the U.S. state of Missouri. Richland Township was created in 1822, and so named on account of its rich soil.

References

Townships in Missouri
Townships in Scott County, Missouri